The Barlow Baxter House is a prow house-style house in Hestand, Kentucky which was built in 1904.  It was listed on the National Register of Historic Places in 2001.

Its 2001 NRHP nomination describes it:The Barlow Baxter House was built ca. 1904, and is a two-story frame dwelling built in a "prow house" type. The house has very simplified Queen Anne-style detailing in its milled porch columns and railing which extends around three facades of the projecting wing. The house has a gable roof of original metal standing seam, interior brick chimneys, a concrete block and poured concrete foundation, and exterior of weatherboard siding. On the main (W), south, and east facades is a two-story wraparound porch. The porch has a concrete floor, original chamfered wood columns, cut out eave brackets, and an original milled railing with square balusters.

References

Prow houses
Houses on the National Register of Historic Places in Kentucky
Houses completed in 1904
National Register of Historic Places in Monroe County, Kentucky
1904 establishments in Kentucky
Queen Anne architecture in Kentucky